Serbomans (Serbo-Croatian and ;) is a Bulgarian pejorative term used by Bulgarian nationalists for inhabitants in the region of Macedonia that claimed Serbian ethnicity (declared as Serbs) and supported Serbian national ideals until the middle of the 20th century. They explained it as being imposed by Serbian propaganda promulgating a secondary identity, which resulted in a Bulgarian population that had lost its real nationality. It is also still used pejoratively by Bulgarians to refer to residents of North Macedonia who proclaimed a separate Macedonian identity and act to subdue Bulgarian nationalism in Macedonia. The term first appeared during the time of the Serbian-Bulgarian rivalry for present-day North Macedonia during the second half of the 19th century.

References

See also 
 Serbophilia
 Grecoman
 Bulgarophiles

Serbs of North Macedonia
Anti-Serbian sentiment
Pejorative terms for European people
Bulgaria–Serbia relations
North Macedonia–Serbia relations
Bulgarian nationalism